Griston is a village and civil parish in the Wayland area of the  Breckland district within the English county of Norfolk.
For the purposes of local government, it falls within the district of Breckland.

It has a church in the name of St. Peter and St. Paul, a pub 'The Waggon And Horses', an elderly home 'Thorp House', a day care centre for the elderly, it hosts part of the RAF Watton wartime airfield (now belonging to the USAAF), and the category C Wayland (HM Prison).  It lies between the town Watton, Norfolk, where the nearest high school is Wayland Academy and a fellow Wayland village of Caston, where the nearest primary school is Caston CE VA Primary School.

History of Griston 
The villages name origin is uncertain possibly 'griss's farm/settlement' or perhaps 'young pig farm/settlement'.

The village can be traced way back to the Domesday Book.

The local Griston Hall near Wayland Wood is in folklore the abode of the wicked uncle who ordered the death of his wards, the Babes in the Wood, so that he could inherit their property. The village sign reflects the story.

The village used to be made up of houses built for  prison officers that worked at the prison.

Watton and Griston Link
As part of the Sustrans Connect2 project proposals are in place to create a cycling and walking route between Griston and the market town of Watton. The new route would follow the boundary of the Watton airfield and provide a shorter, traffic free alternative to the A1075. Norfolk County Council have allocated a £40,000 contribution towards funding of the scheme. A schematic map of the scheme has been published online.

References 

http://kepn.nottingham.ac.uk/map/place/Norfolk/Griston

Villages in Norfolk
Breckland District
Civil parishes in Norfolk